Samata Das is an Indian actress. She rose to fame for her role as Lati in Buddhadev Dasgupta's National Award winning film Mondo Meyer Upakhyan (2002).

Personal life 
Das married Bengali television assistant director Shankar Chanda, right after appearing at the Higher Secondary examination. She later studied at the Jogesh Chandra Chaudhuri College of the University of Calcutta.

Filmography

 Mondo Meyer Upakhyan (2002)
 Desh
 Lal Ronger Duniya
 Nagordola (2005)
 Ek Mutho Chhobi
 Manik (2005)
 Hero (2006)

Television
 Ek Akasher Niche (Tuski)
 Sonar Horin
 Rani Kahinee
 Sukh Thikana Baikunthapur
 Srestha Upohar
 Chokher Tara Tui(Mithul)
 Nader Nimai (2012)
 Karunamoyee Rani Rashmoni( Jogmaya mother-in-law of Rani Rashmoni 2017)
 Sreemoyee(Sreemoyee"s Sister)
 Soudaminir Songsar(Moynamothi)
 Saraswatir Prem
 Dutta And Bouma
 Gouri Elo
 Boddhisattowar Bodhbuddhi
 Dhulokona

References

External links
 
 The little woman of Bengali soaps has returned
 Coming of Age in a Bengali Brothel

Actresses in Bengali cinema
Living people
University of Calcutta alumni
Bengali television actresses
Indian film actresses
Indian television actresses
Year of birth missing (living people)